Veľké Kosihy (Hungarian pronunciation:) is a village and municipality in the Komárno District in the Nitra Region of southwest Slovakia.

Etymology
The village was named after the Magyar tribe Keszi.

Geography 
The village lies at an altitude of 112 metres and covers an area of 24.403 km².
It has a population of 970 people, of whom 85.5% are of Hungarian and 11.1% are of Slovak ethnicity.

History 
In the 9th century, the territory of Veľké Kosihy became part of the Kingdom of Hungary. In historical records the village was first mentioned in 1268. After the Austro-Hungarian army disintegrated in November 1918, Czechoslovak troops occupied the area, later acknowledged internationally by the Treaty of Trianon. Between 1938 and 1945 Veľké Kosihy once more  became part of Miklós Horthy's Hungary through the First Vienna Award. From 1945 until the Velvet Divorce, it was part of Czechoslovakia. Since then it has been part of Slovakia.

Facilities 
The village has a public library and a football pitch.

References

External links 

 Official website 

Villages and municipalities in the Komárno District
Hungarian communities in Slovakia